The women's handball competition, one of two events of handball at the 2000 Summer Olympics, in Sydney, took place at The Dome (Sydney Olympic Park) during the preliminary round, quarter-finals, semi-finals and medal matches. A total of 150 players, distributed among ten national teams, participated in this tournament.

Medalists

Qualification

Squads

Preliminary round
For the preliminary round, the ten teams were distributed into two groups of five teams. Each team played against each of its four group opponents for a total of four matches. The four best-scoring teams advanced to the quarter-finals.

Group A

Group B

Knockout stage

Bracket

Quarterfinals

5–8th place semifinals

Semifinals

Ninth place game

Seventh place game

Fifth place game

Bronze medal game

Gold medal game

Rankings and statistics

Final ranking

Top goalscorers

References

External links
Official Report of the XXVIIth Olympiad – Handball

W
Women's handball in Australia
2000 in women's handball
2000 in Australian women's sport
Women's events at the 2000 Summer Olympics